The Batui Mountains (Pegunungan Batui) are a mountain range in Central Sulawesi, Indonesia. The range runs east–west and forms part of the spine of the East Peninsula of the island of Sulawesi.

Notes and references

Mountains of Sulawesi